Germany competed at the 2002 Winter Olympics in Salt Lake City, United States. In terms of gold medals, Germany finished ranking second with 12 gold medals. Meanwhile, the 36 total medals won by German athletes were the most of any nation at these Games, as well at any Winter Olympics, until this record was broken by the United States at the 2010 Winter Olympics.

Medalists

Alpine skiing

Men

Women

Women's combined

Biathlon

Men

Men's 4 × 7.5 km relay

Women

Women's 4 × 7.5 km relay

 1 A penalty loop of 150 metres had to be skied per missed target. 
 2 Starting delay based on 10 km sprint results. 
 3 One minute added per missed target. 
 4 Starting delay based on 7.5 km sprint results.

Bobsleigh

Men

Women

Cross-country skiing

Men
Sprint

Pursuit

 1 Starting delay based on 10 km C. results. 
 C = Classical style, F = Freestyle

4 × 10 km relay

Women
Sprint

Pursuit

 2 Starting delay based on 5 km C. results. 
 C = Classical style, F = Freestyle

4 × 5 km relay

Curling

Men's tournament

Group stage
Top four teams advanced to semi-finals.

|}

Contestants

Women's tournament

Group stage
Top four teams advanced to semi-finals.

|}

Tie-breaker

|}

Contestants

Figure skating

Pairs

Ice Dancing

Ice hockey

Men's tournament

Preliminary round - group A
Top team (shaded) advanced to the first round.

First round - group C

Quarter final

Team roster
Marc Seliger
Robert Müller
Christian Künast
Dennis Seidenberg
Daniel Kunce
Christoph Schubert
Mirko Lüdemann
Erich Goldmann
Christian Ehrhoff
Andreas Renz
Jörg Mayr
Len Soccio
Klaus Kathan
Mark MacKay
Stefan Ustorf
Tobias Abstreiter
Andreas Morczinietz
Jochen Hecht
Andreas Loth
Marco Sturm
Jan Benda
Martin Reichel
Jürgen Rumrich
Wayne Hynes
Daniel Kreutzer
Head coach: Hans Zach

Women's tournament

First round - group B
Top two teams (shaded) advanced to semifinals.

Classification round
5th place semi-final

5th place game

Luge

Men

(Men's) Doubles

Women

Nordic combined 

Men's sprint

Events:
 large hill ski jumping
 7.5 km cross-country skiing 

Men's individual

Events:
 normal hill ski jumping
 15 km cross-country skiing 

Men's Team

Four participants per team.

Events:
 normal hill ski jumping
 5 km cross-country skiing

Short track speed skating

Men

Women

Skeleton

Men

Women

Ski jumping 

Men's team large hill

 1 Four teams members performed two jumps each.

Snowboarding

Men's parallel giant slalom

Men's halfpipe

Women's parallel giant slalom

Women's halfpipe

Speed skating

Men

Women

References
 Olympic Winter Games 2002, full results by sports-reference.com

Nations at the 2002 Winter Olympics
2002
Winter Olympics